This is an incomplete list of New York State Historic Markers in Rensselaer County, New York.

Listings county-wide

See also

List of New York State Historic Markers
National Register of Historic Places listings in Rensselaer County, New York
List of National Historic Landmarks in New York

References

Rensselaer County, New York
Rensselaer